Gary Bertini (May 1, 1927 – March 17, 2005) was one of the most important Israeli musicians and conductors. 
In 1978 he was awarded the Israel Prize for Music.

Biography
Gary Bertini was born Shloyme Golergant in Bricheva, Bessarabia, then in Romania, now in Donduşeni District, Moldova. His father, K. A. Bertini (Aron Golergant), was a poet and translator of the Russian (Leonid Andereyev) and Yiddish (A.Sutzkever, H. Leivick) literature into Hebrew, and of the Hebrew works into Yiddish. His mother Berta Golergant was a physician and biologist. They immigrated to Palestine in 1946. Gary studied music at the Music Teachers' College in Tel Aviv and then in Milan, Italy, and at the Paris Conservatoire.

Upon returning to Israel, Gary Bertini established Rinat (the Israel Chamber Choir) in 1955. He was musical advisor to the Batsheva Dance Company and composed incidental music for numerous productions of Habima, the Israel national theater, and the Cameri Theatre. He founded the Israel Chamber Orchestra in 1965 and was its conductor until 1975. In 1976 he conducted the world premiere of Josef Tal's Ashmedai at the Hamburg State Opera.

Bertini was conductor of the Jerusalem Symphony Orchestra from 1978 to 1986. He was also the artistic director of the Israeli Opera from 1988 to 1997. He promoted Israeli music and helped shape it.

Bertini was hospitalized while in Paris, then transferred to a hospital in Tel Hashomer, Israel. He died there on 17 March 2005 and was buried in Kfar Vitkin.

Bertini's work also took him outside Israel. He was music advisor to the Detroit Symphony Orchestra from 1981 to 1983 and the Principal Conductor of the Cologne Radio Symphony Orchestra from 1983 until 1991. He also served as general music director of the Opern- und Schauspielhaus Frankfurt from 1987 to 1990, the Tokyo Metropolitan Symphony Orchestra from 1998 to 2005, and, just before he died, director of the Teatro di San Carlo in Naples. He also worked as a guest conductor with the Hamburg State Opera, Scottish Opera, La Scala, Opéra National de Paris, and the Berlin Philharmonic among other organizations.

Bertini's recording of the complete cycle of Mahler symphonies (EMI Classics 40238) is very well regarded.

Awards
 1978 -  Israel Prize for Music, Israel 
 1995 - Abiatti Prize: Best Conductor, Italy
 1998 - Abiatti Prize: Best Operatic Conductor, Italy
2000 - Prime Minister Award for Composers, Israel
 2003 - Académie Charles Cros – Grand Prix Audiovisuel & DVD pour Prokofiev: La Guerre et la Paix, France

See also
List of Israel Prize recipients

References

External links 
 Gary Bertini official website
 Short biography in Hebrew
 Obituary of Gary Bertini in The Independent (London)
 Memorial essay on Gary Bertini by Michal Smoira-Cohn for the Israel Music Institute
 Interview with Gary Bertini, September 12, 1990

	

1927 births
2005 deaths
People from Dondușeni District
Moldovan Jews
Bessarabian Jews
Soviet emigrants to Mandatory Palestine
Israeli people of Moldovan-Jewish descent
Israeli Ashkenazi Jews
Israeli conductors (music)
Israeli composers
Jewish classical musicians
Jewish composers
20th-century conductors (music)
Israel Prize in music recipients